Kalamaki was a seaside settlement, and current residential and commercial neighborhood within Alimos, a municipality on the south side of Athens, Greece. The coastal village of Kalamaki was founded in 1923 as a result of the population exchange between Greece and Turkey by resettled ethnic Greeks from the Anatolian village of Kalamaki, which was renamed to Kalkan. Between 1942 and 1945, Kalamaki joined the neighboring coastal settlement of Phalerum, to form the municipality of Palaio Faliro. In 1968, the settlement was administratively merged with the inland community of Trachones to the east, together forming the contemporary municipality of Alimos. The area of Kalamaki corresponds to the location of Alimos, an ancient deme of the Athenian democracy in classical antiquity

References

Populated places in South Athens (regional unit)